Understanding is a psychological process related to an abstract or physical object, such as a person, situation, or message whereby one is able to use concepts to model that object.
Understanding is a relation between the knower and an object of understanding. Understanding implies abilities and dispositions with respect to an object of knowledge that are sufficient to support intelligent behavior.

Understanding is often, though not always, related to learning concepts, and sometimes also the theory or theories associated with those concepts. However, a person may have a good ability to predict the behavior of an object, animal or system—and therefore may, in some sense, understand it—without necessarily being familiar with the concepts or theories associated with that object, animal, or system in their culture. They may have developed their own distinct concepts and theories, which may be equivalent, better or worse than the recognized standard concepts and theories of their culture. Thus, understanding is correlated with the ability to make inferences.

Definition 
Understanding and knowledge are both words without unified definitions  so Ludwig Wittgenstein looked past a definition of knowledge or understanding and looked at how the words were used in natural language, identifying relevant features in context.  It has been suggested that knowledge alone has little value whereas knowing something in context is understanding,  which has much higher relative value but it has also been suggested that a state short of knowledge can be termed understanding.  

Someone's understanding can come from perceived causes  or non causal sources,  suggesting knowledge being a pillar of where understanding comes from. We can have understanding while lacking corresponding knowledge and have knowledge while lacking the corresponding understanding.  Even with knowledge, relevant distinctions or correct conclusion about similar cases may not be made  suggesting more information about the context would be required, which eludes to different degrees of understanding depending on the context.  To understand something implies abilities and dispositions with respect to an object of knowledge that are sufficient to support intelligent behavior.  

Understanding could therefore be less demanding than knowledge, because it seems that someone can have understanding of a subject even though they might have been mistaken about that subject. But it is more demanding in that it requires that the internal connections among ones’ beliefs actually be “seen” or “grasped” by the person doing the understanding when found at a deeper level. 

Explanatory realism and the propositional model suggests understanding comes from causal propositions  but, it has been argued that knowing how the cause might bring an effect is understanding.  As understanding is not directed towards a discrete proposition, but involves grasping relations of parts to other parts and perhaps the relations of part to wholes.  The relationships grasped helps understanding, but the relationships aren't always causal.  So understanding could therefore be expressed by knowledge of dependencies.

Examples
 One understands the weather if one is able to predict (e.g. if it is very cloudy, it may rain) and/or give an explanation of some of its features, etc.
 A psychiatrist understands another person's anxieties if he/she knows that person's anxieties, their causes, and can give useful advice on how to cope with the anxiety.
 One understands a piece of reasoning or an argument if one can consciously reproduce the information content conveyed by the message.
 One understands a language to the extent that one can reproduce the information content conveyed by a broad range of spoken utterances or written messages in that language.

Shallow and deep
Someone who has a more sophisticated understanding, more predictively accurate understanding, and/or an understanding that allows them to make explanations that others commonly judge to be better, of something, is said to understand that thing "deeply". Conversely, someone who has a more limited understanding of a thing is said to have a "shallow" understanding. However, the depth of understanding required to usefully participate in an occupation or activity may vary greatly.

For example, consider multiplication of integers. Starting from the most shallow level of understanding, we have (at least) the following possibilities:

 A small child may not understand what multiplication is, but may understand that it is a type of mathematics that they will learn when they are older at school. This is "understanding of context"; being able to put an as-yet not-understood concept into some kind of context. Even understanding that a concept is not part of one's current knowledge is, in itself, a type of understanding (see the Dunning–Kruger effect, which is about people who do not have a good understanding of what they do not know).
 A slightly older child may understand that multiplication of two integers can be done, at least when the numbers are between 1 and 12, by looking up the two numbers in a times table. They may also be able to memorise and recall the relevant times table in order to answer a multiplication question such as "2 times 4 is what?". This is a simple form of operational understanding; understanding a question well enough to be able to do the operations necessary to be able to find an answer.
 A yet older child may understand that multiplication of larger numbers can be done using a different method, such as long multiplication, or using a calculator. This is a more advanced form of operational understanding because it supports answering a wider range of questions of the same type.
 A teenager may understand that multiplication is repeated addition, but not understand the broader implications of this. For example, when their teacher refers to multiplying 6 by 3 as "adding up 3 sixes", they may understand that the teacher is talking about two entirely equivalent things. However, they might not understand how to apply this knowledge to implement multiplication as an algorithm on a computer using only addition and looping as basic constructs. This level of understanding is "understanding a definition" (or "understanding the definition" when a concept only has one definition).
This is "relational understanding"; understanding how multiplication relates to division.
 An undergraduate studying mathematics may come to learn that "the integers equipped with multiplication" is merely one example of a range of mathematical structures called monoids, and that theorems about monoids apply equally well to multiplication and other types of monoids.

For the purpose of operating a cash register at McDonald's, a person does not need a very deep understanding of the multiplication involved in calculating the total price of two Big Macs. However, for the purpose of contributing to number theory research, a person would need to have a relatively deep understanding of multiplication — along with other relevant arithmetical concepts such as division and prime numbers.

Assessment 
It is possible for a person, or a piece of "intelligent" software, that in reality only has a shallow understanding of a topic, to appear to have a deeper understanding than they actually do, when the right questions are asked of it. The most obvious way this can happen is by memorization of correct answers to known questions, but there are other, more subtle ways that a person or computer can (intentionally or otherwise) deceive somebody about their level of understanding, too. This is particularly a risk with artificial intelligence, in which the ability of a piece of artificial intelligence software to very quickly try out millions of possibilities (attempted solutions, theories, etc.) could create a misleading impression of the real depth of its understanding. Supposed AI software could in fact come up with impressive answers to questions that were difficult for unaided humans to answer, without really understanding the concepts at all, simply by dumbly applying rules very quickly. (However, see the Chinese room argument for a controversial philosophical extension of this argument.)

Examinations are designed to assess students' understanding (and sometimes also other things such as knowledge and writing abilities) without falling prey to these risks. They do this partly by asking multiple different questions about a topic to reduce the risk of measurement error, and partly by forbidding access to reference works and the outside world to reduce the risk of someone else's understanding being passed off as one's own. Because of the faster and more accurate computation and memorization abilities of computers, such tests would arguably often have to be modified if they were to be used to accurately assess the understanding of an artificial intelligence.

Conversely, it is even easier for a person or artificial intelligence to fake a shallower level of understanding than they actually have; they simply need to respond with the same kind of answers that someone with a more limited understanding, or no understanding, would respond with — such as "I don't know", or obviously wrong answers. This is relevant for judges in Turing tests; it is unlikely to be effective to simply ask the respondents to mentally calculate the answer to a very difficult arithmetical question, because the computer is likely to simply dumb itself down and pretend not to know the answer.

As a model
Gregory Chaitin, a noted computer scientist, propounds a view that comprehension is a kind of data compression. In his essay "The Limits of Reason", he argues that understanding something means being able to figure out a simple set of rules that explains it. For example, we understand why day and night exist because we have a simple model—the rotation of the earth—that explains a tremendous amount of data—changes in brightness, temperature, and atmospheric composition of the earth. We have compressed a large amount of information by using a simple model that predicts it. Similarly, we understand the number 0.33333... by thinking of it as one-third. The first way of representing the number requires five concepts ("0", "decimal point", "3", "infinity", "infinity of 3"); but the second way can produce all the data of the first representation, but uses only three concepts ("1", "division", "3"). Chaitin argues that comprehension is this ability to compress data.

Religious perspectives
Cognition helps us gain knowledge which can affect our level of understanding or 'right view' as expressed in buddhism. Understanding also is seen in the seven gifts of the Holy Spirit helping an individual with their insight into God's providence.

See also 

 Active listening
 Awareness
 Binah (Kabbalah)
 Chinese room
 Communication
 Concept
 Epistemology
 Hermeneutic circle
 Informational listening
 Ishin-denshin
 Lie-to-children
 List of language disorders
 Meaning (linguistics)
 Natural language understanding
 Mental model
 Nous
 Perception
 Thought

References

External links 

Cognition
Concepts in epistemology
Concepts in metaphilosophy
Concepts in metaphysics
Concepts in the philosophy of mind
Intelligence
Knowledge
Metaphysics of mind
Ontology
Thought
Virtue